Anuj Tiwari (born 22 November 1988) is an Indian author of six novels. His first novel, Journey of Two Hearts, was published by Srishti Publishers in 2012. He is the first Indian author to write a book, Give Your Heart a Break, on sibling relationships. He has co-authored the book "Cappuccino" with Sneha Pandey
 
Tiwari stands at number seven amongst the top 15 influential Indian authors on social media. He is the recipient of the Newspapers Association of India Achiever Awards 2014, which named him as the "Best Upcoming Novelist". In 2017, he was shortlisted for the 2018 International Young Author Awards in Dubai. Tiwari also represented India in Qatar in 2019 and hosted a session about Impact of culture on writing.

Early life

His Sanskrit was much better than his Hindi, and of course, than his English. His determination to impress someone led him to write his first book. It changed everything for him with his later books, which were inspirational and based on true stories. Anuj recently married his long-time girlfriend Anushka, also known as Sneha Panday. All five of his books are inspired by their own love story.

Career
Tiwari has spoken at TEDx conferences in India. 

He claims to have not read even a single book, therefore having no derived inspiration from authors. He writes about reality to which readers can relate. His first book, Journey Of Two Hearts, was based on a diary (given to him by his girlfriend) he wrote in when he was in a hospital. His more recent book, It Had to Be You, is again a reflection of reality.
He is now an author of five books based on real incidents.
Having spoken in many colleges and universities, his stories are based on real-life scenarios that he has recorded over the years. With an MBA degree in finance and human resources management, Tiwari works in Mumbai as an IT professional and marketing consultant.

Entrepreneur 
Anuj Tiwari is the founder of a Mumbai-based digital agency called TheAllDigital.

Screen Adaption 
Several production houses have approached Anuj Tiwari's Barabanki about audio-visual rights.

Novels 
Journey of Two Hearts (2012) – It was the debut novel for Anuj Tiwari. It was published on 5 September 2012. This book is his life's story. A software engineer by profession in Mumbai Anuj Tiwari who crossed a bad phase in his life and has come with his true story Journey Of Two Hearts! –will be cherished forever. He had gifted this book to Pakhi after they got departed after a heartbreak, to get together all the lovely moments they shared together once again.
It Had to Be You (2014) – This book by Anuj Tiwari is written in an easy-to-understand language and is being liked by young readers because of its simplicity and the language which directly influences the lover's heart. Through his casual tone and lingo, Anuj Tiwari creates a sense of closeness between the protagonist and the readers. The writer uses a language that we normally would use in our everyday lives and the youth have given the thumbs-up to this form of writing.
It's Not Right but It's Okay – (2016) The novel "It's not right but It's Okay" projects a realistic approach to the day-to-day events that occur around us. Everyone in life would fall in love with someone and not all love stories have a successful ending. The sequel of events is similar to those that we have witnessed in our life or happened to our near and dear.
I Tagged Her in My Heart (2017) – The story revolves around the life of four friends — Arjun, Anushka, Ved, and Adrika — who all are dealing with some or the other issues in their lives. Another character who has a constant presence throughout the novel is  Anushka's mother Dimpy aunty who behaves less like a typical mother and more like a dependable friend. With her being a constant support, the story focuses more on friendship and less on the possible love angles between the four friends.
Give Your Heart a Break (2019) – Inspired by true events, Anuj Tiwari's Give Your Heart a Break is a tale of loss, hope, and the unshakeable sibling bond. It's a story of three people – Arjun, an author, his cousin Agastya and their sister Addya. Within a year Addya's marriage, the relation turns sour, with her husband Bali beating and abusing her. She copes as much as she can, until one day she can't and returns home to Agastya. Agastya seeks revenge for her sister.
Ms. Understanding (2020) - Aren't three years enough to forget someone? Ms. Understanding is the story of Madhav and Nukti. A renowned author on his way to his college as an alumnus where he meets his ex. Nukti, who is completing her degree soon. How does the rewind button play an important role, to know, listen to Anuj Tiwari's first audiobook "Ms. Understanding" inspired by real life events.
Nine Things Before Falling in Love: Best of Anuj Tiwari's Talks (2020) - It's about one of the truths I have noticed and wanted to share with everyone. Stay single until you find someone who can match your loyalty. Stay single until you find someone who can reciprocate your effort. Stay single until you find someone who can give back the same amount of attention you put out. Stay single until you find someone who can make the same amount of time you share.
cappuccino (2020) - Some stories are so close to reality that they don't seem to be stories any more.  And sometimes, such incidents happen over period of time that they seem to be stories. One of such stories - that was reality or just a story, Arjun didn't know himself. Co-authored with "Sneha Panday"
Ishq Uthal Puthal (2020)
Dil Raazi Ishqbaazi (2021) - क्या जिंदगी के नियमों और शर्तों के बाद भी आप उसे आसानी से गुजार सकते हैं? या उसकी वैधानिक चेतावनियों के बावजूद खुलकर सपने देख सकते हैं और उसे पूरी तरह जी सकते हैं? यह उपन्यास एक ऐसी युवा जोड़ी की कहानी है जो मानती है कि जीवन में कोई रिप्ले या रिवाइंड बटन नहीं होता। अनुज ने कभी सोचा भी नहीं था कि उस जिंदादिल पाखी के लिए उसके एहसास एक दिन उसकी कल्पना से परे परवान चढ़ेंगे जो प्यार में क तक नहीं करती थी। अभी सबकुछ ठीक होता दिख रहा था कि हमेशा की तरह जिंदगी उनके मंसूबों पर पानी फेरने लगती है। आसान शब्दों में यह कहानी हमें परिवार, भरोसा, समर्पण और दोस्ती के महत्त्व को बताती है। ‘किसी से प्यार करना मुश्किल नहीं, मगर सच्चा साहस सदा के लिए उसका हो जाने में है।’.
Barabanki (2022)

References

External links 
 Official website

Indian male novelists
People from Bareilly
Living people
Writers from Uttar Pradesh
1988 births